The Collection at RiverPark is an outdoor lifestyle center located east of the 101 Freeway in Oxnard, California. The shopping center held its grand opening on November 15, 2012; and is anchored by Target, Whole Foods Market, REI, The Container Store, and a 16-screen Cinemark cinema. Originally planned to open in 2008, The Collection was delayed due to the Great Recession.

Tenants 
The Collection at RiverPark features a mix of national and region businesses, ranging from grocery stores and beauty salons to traditional mall tenants. Notable retailers include Target, Whole Foods, REI, H&M, Victoria's Secret, Sephora, Chico's, White House Black Market, ULTA Beauty, and Finish Line.

Restaurant tenants include Cheesecake Factory, Yard House, Lazy Dog Restaurant & Bar, Panera Bread, and Starbucks Coffee.

Public art
The Collection features several public art installations. The developer, Shea Properties spent about $1 million on art projects for the center. Frank Romero, Michael Amescua, Frank Bauer, Kevin Newman, Peter Shire, Susan Stinsmuehlen-Amend, and Sammy Silberstein
contributed to the art program.

References

External links

 Official Website

Buildings and structures in Oxnard, California
Shopping malls in Ventura County, California
Shopping malls established in 2012